In the Russian Orthodox Church, a house church is a church parish that is intended for performing religious services for members of a particular institution. These particular churches are sometimes outside the jurisdiction of the corresponding territorial administrative unit.

Overview 

House churches can be attached to hospitals, orphanages, and other charitable organizations, but these types of churches can be seen as well within educational institutions like secondary schools and universities. They are intended for the religious participation of individuals staying at or studying within these host establishments.

Background 

The term house church can mean various things within Christianity and has historically not been applied universally to refer to a specific concept. Early Christian churches were generally found within the houses of individual worshipers. However, it can also be used to describe a church that operates under this or similar structures.

History 
Original house churches were not considered parishes but instead to have belonged to the private institution or person that owned the building. As they were not considered parishes, extensive records are not available of where they were located or how many of these churches existed. However, they were likely a popular source of attraction among Moscow's historical churches.

Following the Russian Revolution and the subsequently passed Decree on Separation of Church and State, all church property rights and legal identities were revoked entirely. While this severely impacted how regular parish churches operated, it did not have any effect on home churches which had neither property nor a separate legal identity from their host institutions to begin with and thus were effectively independent of the state. Ironically, the decree that was meant to hurt the freedoms of religious assembly ended up protecting them for house churches.

However this protection did not last, and in August 1918 the People's Commissariat sent instructions out that all house churches at educational institutions would mandatorily be closed (roughly 16% of all house churches). Despite being nominally limited to just house churches within schools and museums, the instruction was rigidly applied to effectively outlaw all house churches. While some house churches managed to convert to parish churches, others were not so fortunate. By the end of 1920, 13 house churches had been closed down and liquidated.

Types

Within the military 

On 4 September 2018, Russian Defense Minister Sergey Shoygu announced plans for the construction of a cathedral to be located within Patriot Park outside Moscow. The church would be built by 2020 and would reportedly stand to honor the Soviet Union's victory over Nazi Germany in World War II. The cathedral is planned to be the world's third largest Orthodox church, and it will feature a Russo-Byzantine style of architecture.

A month later, Shoygu stated that the front steps of the church building will be made from former Nazi Germany military hardware which was captured and taken as trophies by the Red Army. The building is planned to be colored in a camouflage green, topped with six golden domes, and have several glass panels throughout.

A foundation called Voskreseniye was set up to collect funds from the public to build the planned cathedral. The head of Vokreseniye, Vladimir Bogatyryov, has stated that the cathedral will be used to train and educate so called war priests.

Within colleges 
According to Vladimir V. Belokurov, vice rector at Moscow State University, house churches within educational institutions like colleges and universities are critical to the learning experience for students. In an interview with Tatyana's Day, Belokurov cited their ability to raise spiritual and cultural awareness for individual students and their positive contributions to campus life.

Current status 
In 2005 there were 112 house churches within Moscow, but  this number was 164.

See also
 House church (China) – for house churches in Chinese Christendom

Notes

References

Russian Orthodox Church in Russia